The 2021 European Artistic Roller Skating Championships were held in Riccione, Italy from September 3 – 11, 2021. Organized by European Confederation of Roller Skating and Federazione Italiana Sport Rotellistici, the event took place at the playhall Arena with 1,500-seats capacity.

Venue

Participating nations
14 nations entered the competition.

Medallists

Medal table

References

External links 
All results
Live streaming

European 2021
Artistic Roller Skating European Championships
Artistic Roller Skating European Championships
International sports competitions hosted by Italy
European Artistic Roller Skating Championships